Christopher William Cope (born March 5, 1983) is a former American mixed martial artist who competed in the welterweight division. He was a competitor on The Ultimate Fighter: Team Lesnar vs. Team dos Santos, and has also competed for the UFC as well as Strikeforce.

Background
Born and raised in Carmel Valley, California, Chris Cope began training in karate when he was eight years old before progressing into Taekwondo and then Kempo. While at Carmel High School, he added kickboxing to his game and began to fight on the local mixed martial arts circuit. Cope was one of only four juniors to earn a spot on the 1999–2000 Carmel High Varsity basketball team, which featured several future college players. He also played baseball all four years of high school.

In April 2000, Cope participated in a week-long trip to the California high desert at Anza Borrego and Joshua Tree. This trip, which combined intense physical training with deep spiritual reflection, was to have a profound effect on Cope's athletic and philosophical development.
Following high school, Cope graduated from The University of California at Santa Barbara where he earned a degree in sociology.

Mixed martial arts career

Early career
He fought on the amateur circuit and earned the International Kickboxing Federation California cruiserweight title in 2004.  Soon after, Cope committed himself to further developing his mixed martial arts repertoire and began grappling with jiu-jitsu expert Jeff Glover to further round out his overall skills. He earned his brown belt in Brazilian Jiu-Jitsu and black belt in tae-kwon-do.

Upon completion of his courses in 2005, Cope joined AKA MMA and trained with the likes of Josh Koscheck, Phil Baroni and Mike Swick.  Three months later he drove south to San Diego and began training with K. J. Noons and Tyrone Glover and, shortly after, turned pro where he amassed a 4–1 overall record.

The self-proclaimed gym rat has settled into Arena MMA after bouncing around several gyms in California.  Cope currently works at a local San Diego law firm but still manages to train two times a day, six days a week.

The Ultimate Fighter
Cope had signed with the UFC in 2011 to compete on The Ultimate Fighter: Team Lesnar vs. Team dos Santos.

Cope was the fifth pick on Team Lesnar and tenth overall. dos Santos had selected Cope to face the heavy favorite, Javier Torres, for the second preliminary bout. After a three-round battle, Cope was declared the winner by unanimous decision.

Cope's quarter-final match was against Team dos Santos' Shamar Bailey. Cope defeated Bailey after two rounds via unanimous decision. Cope showed good takedown defense along with immediately following his corner's advice throughout the fight.

In the semifinals Cope was defeated by Ramsey Nijem via TKO in the second round, knocking him out of the tournament.

Ultimate Fighting Championship
Even though he lost in the semifinals, Cope remained signed after the show. He made his official UFC debut June 4, 2011 on The Ultimate Fighter 13 Finale card, fighting against fellow semifinalist and teammate, Chuck O'Neil.  He won the fight via unanimous decision.

Cope faced promotional newcomer Che Mills on November 5, 2011 at UFC 138.  He lost the fight via TKO .

Cope next fought Matt Brown on February 4, 2012 at UFC 143.  He lost the fight via TKO in the second round.

Following his loss to Brown, Cope was released from the UFC.

Post UFC
Cope had signed with Native Fighting Championship, a region organization, close to his home.

Chris Cope currently resides in New Hyde Park, Long Island, New York. He lives behind a cemetery with an old war veteran.
He currently ranks as the #17 Membership Specialist at the UFC Gym Long Island.

Chris Cope faced Elijah Harshburger for the vacant ROC Welterweight Championship at Ring of Combat 47 on January 24, 2014. Though Cope was the heavy favorite coming into the fight, he lost the fight via rear-naked choke.

Since retiring from fighting Cope has moved to Long Island, New York. He coaches a variety of martial arts including kickboxing, Thai boxing and wrestling with his "Team Xtreme" fighters for both Kickboxing and Mixed Martial Arts at Unique Fitness Xtreme in Shirley, New York.

Championships and Accomplishments
Native Fighting Championship
NFC Welterweight Championship (One time, current)

Mixed martial arts record

|-
|Loss
|align=center|8–4
|Elijah Harshbarger 
|Submission (rear-naked choke)
|Ring of Combat 47
|
|align=center|3
|align=center|1:33
|Atlantic City, New Jersey, United States
|
|-
|Win
|align=center|8–3
|Tlowa Madadafo
|TKO (punches)
|Native Fighting Championship 14
|
|align=center|1
|align=center|2:52
|Campo, California, United States
| Won the NFC Welterweight Championship.
|-
|Win
|align=center|7–3
|Kyle Thier
|TKO (punches)
|Native Fighting Championship 13
|
|align=center|2
|align=center|1:21
|Campo, California, United States
|
|-
|Win
|align=center|6–3
|Cole Thomas
|Submission (guillotine choke)
|Native Fighting Championship 12
|
|align=center|1
|align=center|1:39
|Campo, California, United States
|
|-
|Loss
|align=center|5–3
|Matt Brown
|TKO (punches)
|UFC 143
|
|align=center|2
|align=center|1:19
|Las Vegas, Nevada, United States
|
|-
|Loss
|align=center|5–2
|Che Mills
|TKO (knees and punches)
|UFC 138 
|
|align=center|1
|align=center|0:40
|Birmingham, England, United Kingdom
|
|-
|Win
|align=center|5–1
|Chuck O'Neil
|Decision (unanimous)
|The Ultimate Fighter 13 Finale 
|
|align=center|3
|align=center|5:00
|Las Vegas, Nevada, United States
|
|-
|Win
|align=center|4–1
|Ron Keslar
|TKO (head kick and punches)
|Strikeforce: Fedor vs. Werdum 
|
|align=center|2
|align=center|4:32
|San Jose, California, United States
|
|-
|Loss
|align=center|3–1
|Josh Samman
|KO (punches)
|Moon Management: Ubersmash 2 
|
|align=center|1
|align=center|N/A
|Tallahassee, Florida, United States
|
|-
|Win
|align=center|3–0
|Armando Montoya Jr. 
|KO (head kick)
|SBP: Boxing at the Beach 
|
|align=center|2
|align=center|N/A
|Redondo Beach, California, United States
|
|-
|Win
|align=center|2–0
|Marcos Gonzalez 
|Decision (unanimous)
|Battle in the Ballroom 	
|
|align=center|3
|align=center|5:00
|Irvine, California, United States
|
|-
|Win
|align=center|1–0
|Jermaine Wilson		
|Decision (unanimous)
|TC 24: War in the Armory
|
|align=center|3
|align=center|N/A
|Oceanside, California, United States
|

See also
List of male mixed martial artists
List of Brazilian jiu-jitsu practitioners

References

External links

Official UFC Profile

Living people
American male taekwondo practitioners
American male mixed martial artists
Welterweight mixed martial artists
Mixed martial artists utilizing taekwondo
Mixed martial artists utilizing American Kenpo
Mixed martial artists utilizing Brazilian jiu-jitsu
1983 births
American practitioners of Brazilian jiu-jitsu
People from Carmel Valley, California
Ultimate Fighting Championship male fighters